Wallstreet Voodoo is a blues album made by Roine Stolt (The Flower Kings, Transatlantic, The Tangent, Kaipa, Fantasia). The album was released November 11, 2005.


Track listing
All words & music by Roine Stolt except "Sex Kills" by Joni Mitchell.

Disc one
 "The Observer" – 11:05
 "Head Above Water" – 5:25
 "Dirt" – 8:15
 "Everyone Wants To Rule The World" – 4:05
 "Spirit Of The Rebel" – 6:10
 "Unforgiven" – 3:00
 "Dog With A Million Bones" – 8:10
 "Sex Kills" (Joni Mitchell) – 7:20
 "Outcast" – 7:50

Disc two
 "The Unwanted" – 9:00
 "Remember" – 6:55
 "It's All About Money" – 8:05
 "Everybody Is Trying To Sell You Something" – 6:55
 "Hotrod (The Atomic Wrestler)" – 9:10
 "Mercy" – 2:40
 "People That Have The Power To Shape The Future" – 11:05

Sources: and

Personnel
 Roine Stolt – lead vocal, electric guitars, acoustic guitars, percussion
 Neal Morse – Lead & background vocals on "Head Above Water", "Everyone Wants To Rule The World" & "Remember", background vocals on "The Observer" & "It's All About Money", Hammond Organ solo on "Head Above Water"
 Slim Pothead (pseudonym) – Wurlitzer piano, Minimoog,  Hammond organ
 Victor Woof (pseudonym) – Fender bass
 Marcus Liliequist – drums
 Hasse Bruniusson – percussion
 Gonzo Geffen (pseudonym) – congas, percussion, loop treatments
Production
 Thomas Ewerhard – cover art and layout
 Roine Stolt – mixing and mastering

Sources: and

References

2005 albums
Roine Stolt albums